Antillena is a genus of spiders in the family Theraphosidae (tarantulas). , the genus contained a single species, Antillena rickwesti, found in the Dominican Republic.

Taxonomy
The species was first described in 2013 by Rogério Bertani and Jeremy Huff, as Avicularia rickwesti. Only the female was known. The specific name recognizes the contributions to the study of the family Theraphosidae by Rick C. West. At the time of description, it was noted that the species was "very distinct" from others in the genus Avicularia, but no alternative generic placement seemed better. A phylogenetic study published in 2017 suggested that the species was sufficiently distinct from Avicularia to be placed in a separate new genus, Antillena. The generic name refers to the Antilles, where the species' only known locality, the Dominican Republic, is located.

References

Theraphosidae
Monotypic Theraphosidae genera
Spiders of the Caribbean
Arthropods of the Dominican Republic